Viyapath Bambara is a 2010 Sri Lankan Sinhala adult thriller film directed by Prasad De Silva and produced by Gayan Ranadheera for Rupran Films. It stars Anura Dharmasiriwardena and Uthpala Gunatileke in lead roles along with Rupun Ranadheera and Cletus Mendis. Music composed by Sarath de Alwis. It is the 1148th Sri Lankan film in the Sinhala cinema.

Cast
 Anura Dharmasiriwardena
 Uthpala Gunatileke
 Rupun Ranadheera
 Cletus Mendis
 Nandana Hettiarachchi
 Manel Wanaguru
 Nadeeka Gunasekara
 Daya Thennakoon
 Grace Ariyawimal
 Thanuja Dilhani
 Danushka Iroshini

References

External link

2010 films
2010s Sinhala-language films